The Appalachian cottontail (Sylvilagus obscurus) is a species of cottontail rabbit in the family Leporidae. It is a rare species found in the upland areas of the eastern United States.

Taxonomy
The species was only recognized as separate from the New England cottontail (Sylvilagus transitionalis) in 1992.

Description

Sylvilagus obscurus is a small rabbit inhabiting mostly mountainous regions in the eastern U.S. ranging from Pennsylvania to South Carolina and being most prominent in the Appalachians. S. obscurus is better adapted to colder climates than its distant relative, S. floridanus, the eastern cottontail. S. obscurus is light-yellow brown, mixed with black on the dorsal side, having a brown and red patch mixed on the neck. The ventral side is mostly white. S. obscurus is often visually quite similar to the eastern cottontail; a distinguishing factor is a black spot between the ears and a lack of a white spot on the forehead. The Appalachian cottontail and S. transitionalis, the New England cottontail, are not easily distinguished in the field, and are most easily identified geographically. Cottontails found south or west of the Hudson River are considered Appalachian cottontails; those found north and east are considered New England cottontails. The species can otherwise be identified by chromosome number and skull measurements. Female Appalachian cottontails are typically larger than males, with reproductive needs being the most likely cause. The lifespan of S. obscurus is rather short, less than a year in some cases.

Behavior

Sylvilagus obscurus is typically active around dusk or at dawn. During the day they typically avoid predators by sheltering under logs or in burrows. Hibernation does not play a factor due to the rabbit being active year-round. It is believed that there is a social hierarchy within the species, especially when it comes to mating, in which the males assert their dominance by fighting to gain mating priority.

Reproduction
Little is known about the reproductive habits of the Appalachian cottontail, but much can be based on knowledge of the genus Sylvilagus and the reproductive habits of most rabbits. Typically, they are inactive during midwinter, but as the nights shorten and the days lengthen, sexual activity develops strongly amongst Sylvilagus; the reason for this being that day length directly correlates with stimulation of FSH in the female’s blood which then in turn stimulates the follicles to develop ova. This puts the female in "heat" until reproduction occurs, however there is no particular seasonal cycle as the female can remain in this state, deemed pre-estrus, for a while. The breeding season for the Appalachian cottontail has been found to be between February and October. Once fertilization occurs, the gestation period is about 28 days. Before giving birth, the female will begin to dig a nesting depression. She then pulls out her fur from her underbelly and gathers berries and leaves in order to provide a lining for the nest. This hair-pulling also allows for the nipples to be exposed for the offspring to nurse. The offspring, when birthed, will live in the nest with vegetation until they are independent for about 3–4 weeks. Typically, a mother of the genus Sylvilagus will care for her young and visit the nest twice a day to nurse her offspring. An adult female can also breed up to 3-4 times per season and have roughly 3-4 offspring per litter.

Habitat and diet
The Appalachian Mountains provide for S. obscurus a habitat with cover and vegetation such as blackberry, greenbriar, and mountain laurel. Often this is what the Appalachian cottontail feeds on as well as bark and twigs of trees such as red maple, aspen, and black cherry. Usually its diet will consist of twigs, leaves, and fruits. Coprophagy, the eating of its own feces, often occurs as it is useful for it to take up certain vitamins and nutrients that weren’t digested well in the first pass of digestion. This type of diet is found in most of the genus Sylvilagus.

Communication

The Appalachian cottontail has adapted to its role of prey, and because of this it typically has heightened senses of smell, hearing, and sight. This allows for the rabbit to notice predators and react quickly to threats. Mothers have been observed performing a grunting sound in order to alert offspring to the presence of predators. Its senses are also used to find potential mates, and it has been discovered squealing at times when mating occurs.

Threats
There are several threats that have endangered the survival of S. obscurus. These threats involve the destruction and maturation of habitat, as well as habitat fragmentation which is due to urban development. Once fragmentation has occurred the lack of cover exposes the cottontail to predators, increasing the strain on the species.  Hunting is a common reason for deaths of many Appalachian cottontails but is mostly due to lack of knowledge by the hunter. The lack of knowledge of this species, because it is so secretive and rarely found in the wild, also contributes to its being threatened.

References

Sylvilagus
Endemic fauna of the United States
Mammals of the United States
Ecology of the Appalachian Mountains
Natural history of the Great Smoky Mountains
Mammals described in 1992
Taxonomy articles created by Polbot